Pristimantis phragmipleuron is a species of frog in the family Strabomantidae. It is endemic to Colombia where it is known only from its type locality, Pan de Azúcar, Cordillera Central, in the Antioquia Department.
Its natural habitat is tropical cloud forest. It is a rare species threatened by habitat loss; the habitat at the type locality has badly suffered from human settlement and the collection of firewood.

References

phragmipleuron
Amphibians of Colombia
Endemic fauna of Colombia
Amphibians described in 1988
Taxonomy articles created by Polbot